Mariusz Lewandowski (born 18 May 1979) is a Polish football manager and a former player. He currently manages Polish Ekstraklasa side Radomiak Radom.

He was mostly a central defender and could also play as a defensive midfielder. He spent the majority of his club career with Ukrainian side Shakhtar Donetsk, with whom he won the UEFA Cup, five Ukrainian Premier League titles and 3 Ukrainian Cups. In 2009, he was named Polish Footballer of the Year.

Club career 
Born in Legnica, Lewandowski started his career with Polish club Zagłębie Lubin in 1996.

After a short time in Dyskobolia Grodzisk, he was bought by Ukrainian Premier League club Shakhtar Donetsk in 2001. For nine seasons, Lewandowski was an integral part of the team, which won 5 Ukrainian Championships and 3 Ukrainian Cups during his spell in Donetsk. On 20 May 2009, he played in the final of the UEFA Cup against Werder Bremen, with Shakhtar claiming the trophy.

In July 2010, he signed with fellow Ukrainian Premier League side PFC Sevastopol. On 27 November 2013, he left the Crimean club.

On 24 September 2014, after remaining a free agent for 10 months, he announced his retirement.

International career 
He was named in the 23-man Poland's 2006 World Cup squad held in Germany. He was also a member of the Poland squad at Euro 2008.

After Franciszek Smuda took over the national team in 2009, he stopped playing for Poland.

He was however, called up by Waldemar Fornalik in October 2013 for the matches against Ukraine and England in the qualification campaign for the World Cup.

Career statistics

Club

International goals

Honours

Club 
Shakhtar Donetsk
 UEFA Cup: 2008–09
 Ukrainian Premier League: 2001–02, 2004–05, 2005–06, 2007–08, 2009–10
 Ukrainian Cup: 2001–02, 2003–04, 2007–08
 Ukrainian Super Cup: 2005, 2008, 2010

Individual
 Shakhtar Donetsk's All-Time XI
 Polish Player of the Year: 2009

References

External links 

 

1979 births
Living people
Polish footballers
Zagłębie Lubin players
Dyskobolia Grodzisk Wielkopolski players
FC Shakhtar Donetsk players
UEFA Cup winning players
FC Sevastopol players
2006 FIFA World Cup players
Poland international footballers
Polish expatriate footballers
Expatriate footballers in Ukraine
People from Legnica
UEFA Euro 2008 players
Ekstraklasa players
Ukrainian Premier League players
Sportspeople from Lower Silesian Voivodeship
Polish expatriate sportspeople in Ukraine
Association football defenders
Polish football managers
Ekstraklasa managers
I liga managers
Zagłębie Lubin managers
Bruk-Bet Termalica Nieciecza managers
Radomiak Radom managers